It All Came True is a 1940 American musical comedy crime film starring Ann Sheridan as a fledgling singer and Humphrey Bogart, who was third-billed on movie posters, as a gangster who hides from the police in a boarding house. It is based on the Louis Bromfield novel Better Than Life. Sheridan introduced the hit song "Angel in Disguise". The picture was produced by Mark Hellinger and directed by Lewis Seiler. The cast also featured Jeffrey Lynn as the leading man, Zasu Pitts, and Una O'Connor.

Plot
Aspiring songwriter Tommy Taylor pins his hopes on the promises of his employer, gambler and gangster "Chips" Maguire. However, Chips uses the gun he had registered under Tommy's name to kill Monks when he betrays Chips to the police. It turns out Chips had Tommy carry the gun for just such a situation, to provide him with a fall guy. Needing a place to hide out, Chips blackmails Tommy into taking him to the boarding house owned by his mother, Nora Taylor, and her longtime friend, Maggie Ryan, by threatening to turn the gun over to the police.

Nora is overjoyed to see her son after an absence of five years. Tommy introduces them to Chips, who pretends to be a man named Grasselli recovering from a nervous condition. By chance, Maggie's showgirl daughter, Sarah Jane, returns the same day. The two mothers dream of their children getting married, but Tommy seems indifferent to Sarah Jane.

Sarah Jane becomes suspicious of Grasselli, who does his best to avoid being seen. She eventually hides in the hall bathroom and recognizes him, having worked for him once. Unwilling to get Nora and Maggie in trouble, she agrees to keep Chips's secret. Nora starts mothering Chips, as does Maggie after a while. Tired of hiding in his room all the time, Chips emerges and becomes acquainted with the other boarders: Miss Flint, Mr. Salmon, washed-up magician The Great Boldini, and Mr. Van Diver.  In the parlor, Chips enjoys an amateur show put on by Tommy, Sarah Jane, and the boarders.

When Sarah Jane learns that Nora and Maggie are about to lose their house due to unpaid taxes, she turns to Chips for help, encouraging his attentions, even though she is in love with Tommy. He provides the money, but as that will only postpone their financial problem, he suggests (out of sheer boredom) that they set up the boarding house to bring in money by turning it into an exclusive nightclub, with the added advantage that Tommy and Sarah Jane can showcase their talents. Nora is enthusiastic, but it takes some persuasion to get Maggie to go along.

In the meantime, Miss Flint sees Chips's picture in a crime magazine. Sarah Jane intimates that Chips will have her killed in a gruesome manner if she tells anyone what she knows. But on opening night, after drinking too much champagne, she becomes frightened by Chips's taunts and goes to the police station. Two detectives spot Chips in the nightclub, but agree to let him watch the rest of the show. Tommy sees the cops and assumes the worst. He goes to the roof to be alone. When Sarah Jane joins him there, he finally admits he loves her. She urges him to flee, but he refuses to run away. Though he can easily incriminate Tommy, Chips decides to confess to the murder, allowing the young lovers to make a clean beginning.

Cast
 Ann Sheridan as Sarah Jane Ryan
 Jeffrey Lynn as Tommy Taylor
 Humphrey Bogart as Grasselli/Chips Maguire
 ZaSu Pitts as Miss Flint
 Una O'Connor as Maggie Ryan
 Jessie Busley as Mrs. Nora Taylor
 John Litel as "Doc" Roberts
 Grant Mitchell as Mr. Rene Salmon
 Felix Bressart as The Great Boldini
 Charles Judels as Henri Pepi de Bordeaux, the head waiter Chips hires for the nightclub
 Brandon Tynan as Mr. Van Diver
 Howard Hickman as Mr. Prendergast
 Herb Vigran as Monks (credited as Herbert Vigran)
 Tommy Reilly
 The Elderbloom Chorus as Group Performers
 Bender and Daum as Performing Duo
 White and Stanley as Performing Duo
 The Lady Killers' Quartet as Singing Quartet

Production
George Raft and John Garfield were offered the male lead prior to Bogart taking the part.

Years later, Warners re-issued the movie with refilmed opening credits giving Bogart top billing above Sheridan. As this is the version currently airing on Turner Classic Movies, it can be presumed that the original titles have not survived.

References

External links
 
 
 
 

1940 films
1940 musical comedy films
1940s American films
1940s crime comedy films
1940s English-language films
American black-and-white films
American crime comedy films
American musical comedy films
Films based on American novels
Films based on works by Louis Bromfield
Films directed by Lewis Seiler
Warner Bros. films